Malaya Osinovka is a rural locality (a khutor) in Zakharovskoye Rural Settlement, Kletsky District, Volgograd Oblast, Russia. The population was 10 as of 2010.

Geography 
Malaya Osinovka is located on the bank of the Osinovka River, 40 km southwest of Kletskaya (the district's administrative centre) by road. Yevstratovsky is the nearest rural locality.

References 

Rural localities in Kletsky District